Design 1st is a multi-disciplinary design consultancy founded in 1996 by Kevin Bailey, and is headquartered in Ottawa, Ontario, Canada. The firm employs fifteen people in Mechanical Engineering and Industrial Design with four offices in Vancouver, Toronto, Montreal and Ottawa. Design 1st assists companies in multiple stages of product development – specializing in mechanical engineering, FEA, human factors, packaging, industrial design and manufacturability.

Design 1st has grown to become Canada's largest product design consultancy. In 2011 Design 1st won the Ottawa Center of Innovation’s (OCRI) Solution of the Year Award in recognition of their work with a variety of Canadian startup and growing technology companies.

Some of Design 1st clients include: We-Vibe, ProDrive Systems, Mytrak, Pliant (recently acquired by SanDisk), Gesturetek, BelAir Networks, Clearford Industries Inc, QNX (acquired by RIM), Stanely Healthcare and March Networks.

References

External links

Engineering companies of Canada
Industrial design
Companies based in Ottawa